"Swing the Mood" is a song by British novelty pop music act Jive Bunny and the Mastermixers, released as the first single from their debut album, Jive Bunny: The Album (1989). Produced by the father and son DJ team of Andy and John Pickles, "Swing the Mood" is a cut and paste record which fused a number of early rock and roll records with liberal use of Glenn Miller's "In the Mood".

Copyright problems caused a re-recorded version to be released; despite this version being derided by critics, it became a hit in the United Kingdom, spending five weeks at number one on the UK Singles Chart in July and August 1989, partly aided by the Jive Bunny animated character. The record became a worldwide phenomenon, topping the charts of 12 other countries and reaching number 11 on the US Billboard Hot 100. It was the second best-selling single of 1989 in the UK.

This song is traditionally played every Friday morning on Bloomington, Indiana radio station WCLS at 7:15 local time, and is referred to as the, "Friday Fun Song".

Samples
The single samples from the following songs:
 0:00–0:04: Chubby Checker – "Let's Twist Again"
 0:06–0:54: Glenn Miller – "In the Mood"
 0:56–1:23: Bill Haley & His Comets – "Rock Around the Clock"
 1:25–1:38: Bill Haley & His Comets – "Rock-A-Beatin' Boogie"
 1:40–1:49: Little Richard – "Tutti Frutti"
 1:51–2:17: The Everly Brothers – "Wake Up Little Susie"
 2:19–2:26: Eddie Cochran – "C'mon Everybody"
 2:28–2:42: Elvis Presley – "Hound Dog"
 2:44–2:53: Bill Haley & His Comets – "Shake, Rattle and Roll"
 2:55–3:03: Elvis Presley – "All Shook Up"
 3:05–3:23: Elvis Presley – "Jailhouse Rock"
 3:25–3:41: Danny and the Juniors – "At the Hop"
 3:43–3:46: Little Richard – "Tutti Frutti"
 3:48–6:05: Glenn Miller – "In the Mood", "Pennsylvania 6-5000", "Little Brown Jug", "American Patrol", "In the Mood"

The two-second intervals are for the material Jive Bunny was to have written himself, e. g., the mixing.  Otherwise the record would have been regarded as a compilation single, attributable only to "Various Artists". The radio edit cuts much of Glenn Miller's songs, including the second round of the first playing of "In The Mood" at the beginning, and pretty much all of his other songs other than "In The Mood" at the end.

Track listings
 CD single
 "Swing the Mood" (radio mix) — 4:05
 "Glenn Miller Medley" (the J.B. edit) — 3:55

 CD maxi
 "Swing the Mood" (12-inch version) — 6:00
 "Swing the Mood" — 4:05
 "Glenn Miller Medley" (the J.B. edit) — 3:55

Charts

Weekly charts

Year-end charts

Certifications and sales

References

1989 songs
1989 debut singles
Jive Bunny and the Mastermixers songs
Dutch Top 40 number-one singles
European Hot 100 Singles number-one singles
Irish Singles Chart number-one singles
Novelty songs
Number-one singles in Australia
Number-one singles in Austria
Number-one singles in Denmark
Number-one singles in Finland
Number-one singles in Germany
Number-one singles in New Zealand
Number-one singles in Norway
Number-one singles in Spain
SNEP Top Singles number-one singles
UK Singles Chart number-one singles
Ultratop 50 Singles (Flanders) number-one singles
Carrere Records singles